Kotabe Foundry is a casting company established over 800 years ago and operated by the 37th successor to the family business.
It is located in Sakuragawa, Ibaraki Prefecture, Japan at the foot of the famous Mount Tsukuba, where sands and clay for the molds are found.

The main products are:
temple bells
fire bells
rainwater bowls etc.

See also 
Early Japanese iron-working techniques
List of oldest companies

References

External links 
Company website
Bells in Japanese temples

12th-century establishments in Japan
Foundries
Companies based in Ibaraki Prefecture
Metal companies of Japan